'A' Captured Gun Battery was formed in France in September 1918 from personnel of V Heavy Trench Mortar Battery. 'A' Battery was one of four captured gun batteries formed by the Australian Corps heavy artillery to operate captured German guns using ammunition from captured stocks. The other three batteries were operated by British troops. The battery operated three captured German 105 mm guns.

A
Military units and formations established in 1918